"Come Back to Me" is a song by Australian band Indecent Obsession. The song was released as the third single from their debut album Spoken Words (1989). The song peaked at number 40 on the Australian ARIA Chart, but was a number-one hit in Hong Kong. They promoted the song, supporting Debbie Gibson on her Australian tour.

Track listing
 7" Single (102107-7)
 "Come Back To Me - 4:47	
 "Come Back To Me - (instrumental) 4:47

Chart performance

References

External links
 "Come Back to Me" by Indecent Obsession

1990 singles
1989 songs
Indecent Obsession songs
MCA Records singles
Rock ballads
1990s ballads